The 2021–22 Odense Boldklub season was the club's 133rd season, and their 60th appearance in the Danish Superliga.

First team

Last updated on 31 March 2022

Transfers

Transfers in

Transfers out

Loans out

New contracts

Friendlies

Pre-season

Winter

Competitions

Superliga

League table

Results summary

Results by round

Matches

Relegation round

Danish Cup

Squad statistics

Goalscorers
Includes all competitive matches. The list is sorted by shirt number when total goals are equal.

Disciplinary record

Club awards

Player of the Month award

Awarded monthly to the player that was chosen by fans voting on OB's fan app.

References

Odense Boldklub
Odense Boldklub seasons